The Beaumont Exporters was the predominant name of a minor league baseball team located in Beaumont, Texas that played between 1920 and 1957 in the Texas League and the Big State League. Beaumont rejoined the Class AA Texas League (1983-1986) and evolved into today's Northwest Arkansas Naturals.

Baseball Hall of Fame inductees Hank Greenberg (1931-1932),  Whitey Herzog (1952), Carl Hubbell (1928), and Hal Newhouser (1939) played for the Exporters and Rogers Hornsby was the Manager in 1950.

Baseball history in Beaumont
The city of Beaumont was first represented between 1903 and 1905 by the Beaumont Oil Gushers, later renamed the Beaumont Millionaires in the South Texas League. It was later represented in the Texas League from 1912–1917 and 1919 as the Beaumont Oilers. After the Exporters folded, the city was later represented again in the Texas league from 1983–1986 by the Beaumont Golden Gators and in 1994 by the Beaumont Bullfrogs of the Texas-Louisiana league.

The Exporters first formed in 1920 and played at Magnolia Ballpark through 1929 and at Stuart Stadium thereafter. The team was ranked near the bottom of the Texas League standings during the 1920s. 
However, when the Exporters became an affiliate of the Detroit Tigers in the 1930s, its fortunes changed. 

The 1932 club, featuring future Hall of Famer Hank Greenberg, won 100 games and swept the Dallas Steers in the playoffs. Greenberg led the league with 39 home runs and 123 runs scored, while pitcher Schoolboy Rowe, who would star with Greenberg on the 1934–1935 Tiger pennant-winners, posted a league-best 2.34 earned run average. The Exporters won another championship in 1938, behind pitcher Dizzy Trout, the league's MVP. In 1942, the team won the regular-season pennant, but fell in seven games in the playoffs. Then the entire Texas League suspended operations during World War II.

After the war ended, the New York Yankees replaced Detroit as the Exporters' parent club in 1946. A series of last-place teams was followed in 1950 with a championship club managed by Rogers Hornsby — but it was known as the Beaumont Roughnecks that season.

The Exporters name was restored in 1953, but no more titles followed. As an affiliate of the Chicago Cubs (1954) and Milwaukee Braves (1955), it trailed the other seven Texas League teams in attendance. The Exporters then moved to Austin in 1956.

A revised club known as the Exporters then entered the Class B Big State League in 1956 as a St. Louis Cardinals' affiliate.  It struggled on the field, finished last in the BSL in attendance, and briefly transferred to Texas City, Texas, playing as the Texas City Exporters, during July before returning to Beaumont.  The following year, 1957, Beaumont remained in the Big State League as the Beaumont Pirates, a Pittsburgh Pirates' farm club.  The league then folded as an organized baseball circuit at the end of the 1957.

Beaumont remained without a minor league club until 1983 when the Amarillo Gold Sox, the Class AA Texas League affiliate of the San Diego Padres, relocated to become the Beaumont Golden Gators. The Golden Gators played from 1983-1986 before the franchise moved to Wichita, Kansas and became the Wichita Pilots in 1987. The franchise relocated to Springdale, Arkansas in 2008 to become today's Northwest Arkansas Naturals.

Notable alumni

Baseball Hall of Fame alumni

Hank Greenberg (1931-1932) Inducted, 1956
 Whitey Herzog (1952) Inducted, 2010
 Rogers Hornsby (1950, MGR) Inducted, 1942
Carl Hubbell (1928) Inducted, 1947
 Hal Newhouser (1939) Inducted, 1992

Notable alumni
 Sandy Alomar Jr. (1986) 6x MLB All-Star; 1990 AL Rookie of the Year
Elden Auker (1933)
 Bill Bailey (1906, 1919-1921)
 Russ Bauers (1954)

Jim Brosnan (1954)
 Bill Brubaker (1932)
 Buzz Clarkson (1954)
Joe Collins (1946)

Clint Courtney (1947, 1950)
Mark Christman (1936-1937)
 Joey Cora (1986) MLB All-Star
Harry Craft (1951-1952, MGR)
 Roy Cullenbine (1936) 2x MLB All-Star
 Jim Delahanty (1916)
 Cedric Durst (1921)

 Ted Easterly (1920)
 Hoot Evers (1942) 2x MLB All-Star
 Dana Fillingim (1925)
Pete Fox (1932) MLB All-Star
 Johnny Gorsica (1939)
 Sam Gray (1923)
 Bob Grim (1951) MLB All-Star; 1954 AL Rookie of the Year
Ozzie Guillen (1983) 3x MLB All-Star; 1985 AL Rookie of the Year; MGR: 2005 World Series Champion - Chicago White Sox
 Luke Hamlin (1932)
 Dave Hillman (1954)
Ralph Houk (1946) MGR: 1961-1962 World Series Champion - NY Yankees 
Tom Hughes (1926)
 Bill James (1919)
Vern Kennedy (1954-1955) 2x MLB All-Star
 John Kruk (1983) 3x MLB All-Star
Max Lanier (1954) 2x MLB All-Star
 Freddy Leach (1925)
 Mickey Livingston (1954-1955, MGR)
 Johnny Lipon (1942)

 Slim Love (1922)

 Denny Lyons (1903)
Barney McCosky (1938)
 John McCloskey (1919)
 Gil McDougald (1950) 6x MLB All-Star; 1951 AL Rookie of the Year
 Shane Mack (1985-1986)
 Pat Malone (1924)

 Jakie May (1921)
 Heinie Meine (1921)

 Earl Moseley (1919) MLB ERA Title
Pat Mullin (1937-1939) 2x MLB All-Star
 Kid Nance (1912)
 Al Newman (1984)
Skeeter Newsome (1933)
 Al Nixon (1913-1916, 1919-1920)
Steve O'Neill (1942)
Stubby Overmire (1942)
Mark Parent (1983-1984)
Claude Passeau (1933) 5x MLB All-Star
Willie Ramsdell (1954)
Schoolboy Rowe (1932, 1938) 3x MLB All-Star
 Benito Santiago (1985) 5x MLB All-Star; 1987 NL Rookie of the Year
 Pete Schneider (1920)
Rip Sewell (1932) 4x MLB All-Star
 Bob Smith (1921)
Hal Smith (1952)
 Elmer Steele (1914)
Birdie Tebbetts (1936) 4x MLB All-Star
 Bobby Tolan (MGR, 1984-1985)
Mike Tresh (1933) MLB All-Star
Gus Triandos (1951) 4x MLB All-Star
 Bill Trotter (1947)
 Dizzy Trout (1938) 2x MLB All-Star; AL ERA Title

Virgil Trucks (1940 2x MLB All-Star

Dick Wakefield (1942) MLB All-Star
George Watkins (1927)
Jo-Jo White (1931)
Dave Wickersham (1957)
 Hal Wiltse (1923)
Whit Wyatt (1931) 4x MLB All-Star

Rudy York (1933) 7x MLB All-Star

Season-by-season

 * Team operated in Texas City, TX from July 2 to July 7, 1956

References
Johnson, Lloyd, ed., The Minor League Register. Durham, North Carolina: Baseball America, 1994.
Johnson, Lloyd, and Wolff, Miles, ed., The Encyclopedia of Minor League Baseball, 1997 edition. Durham, North Carolina: Baseball America.

External links
WebCite query result
Baseball Reference

Defunct Texas League teams
Defunct baseball teams in Texas
Chicago Cubs minor league affiliates
Detroit Tigers minor league affiliates
Milwaukee Braves minor league affiliates
New York Yankees minor league affiliates
Pittsburgh Pirates minor league affiliates
St. Louis Cardinals minor league affiliates
Baseball teams in Beaumont, Texas
Baseball teams established in 1920
Baseball teams disestablished in 1957
1920 establishments in Texas
1957 disestablishments in Texas
San Diego Padres minor league affiliates
Defunct Big State League teams